The Château de Randan was a former royal domain in the French town on Randan in the department of Puy-de-Dôme.

The châtellenie of Randan is first recorded in the 12th century and the castle in the 13th century. It was rebuilt under Francis I of France and the châtellenie promoted to a dukedom in 1661. It was acquired in 1821 by Princess Adélaïde of Orléans, sister of Louis Philippe II.

The ruins have been listed as an official national monument since February 21, 2001.

References

External links
http://amisdomainerandan.free.fr/

Randan
Monuments historiques of Puy-de-Dôme